This is a complete list of World War I flying aces from the German Empire.

Aces were listed after verifying the date and location of combat, and the foe vanquished, for every victory accredited by an aviator's home air service. Aces awarded honors and thus shown to be notable are linked to their biographies.

References

Works cited
 

Germany